Richard William Matt (June 25, 1966 – June 26, 2015) was an American murderer known for several prison escapes, most notably the 2015 Clinton Correctional Facility escape.

A native of the Buffalo–Niagara Falls metropolitan area where he grew up in foster homes, Matt was a career criminal who had already served several prison terms for various crimes before he and an accomplice robbed, kidnapped and murdered his former boss, William Rickerson in December 1997. After fleeing to Mexico to avoid capture, he murdered a second man, Charles Perrault in February 1998 while attempting to rob him and received a 23-year sentence. After being extradited back to the United States in 2007 and being convicted for Rickerson's murder, Matt began serving a 25 year to life sentence for second-degree murder at the Clinton Correctional Facility. Already having a history of escaping from correctional facilities, he escaped from the facility in June 2015 with fellow prisoner David Sweat, and after twenty days on the run trying to escape to Canada, he was killed by the U.S. Border Patrol. Sweat was captured two days later.

Early life
Richard Matt and his older brother Robert were raised in Tonawanda, New York, a suburb of Buffalo. Richard Matt's biological father, Robert Matt, was convicted of multiple offenses including assault, burglary, issuing bad checks and criminal possession of stolen property. Robert Matt is believed to be dead. The brothers began receiving foster care early in life. Richard's foster father, Vern Edin, and his wife were well known in the community for giving foster care to children, and enrolled the Matt brothers in Little League Baseball. The Edins have since died. Matt had behavioral issues in school, which included a reputation for "terroriz[ing] kids on the [school] bus". He was sent to a group home in his early teens for stealing a houseboat, but escaped by riding on a stolen horse, after which he hid in Allegany State Park.

Early criminal career
Matt had a distaste for legitimate work and consequently compiled a lengthy criminal history. His brother Robert also had a long criminal history, being arrested four times between 1985 and 1989 for crimes including burglary, larceny and assault. The two brothers were never known to have committed crimes together. He was seen as a low-grade criminal mostly involved in thefts and burglaries until he got involved with drugs and developed a reputation for violence. He was used as a criminal informer for several years in the 1980s.

In June 1986, he climbed a fence to escape from the Erie County Correctional Facility, where he was serving a one-year sentence for assault. According to retired Tonawanda policeman David Bently, Matt evaded police for four days, hopping a freight train to his brother's house in Tonawanda where he was ultimately apprehended.

In 1991, Matt convinced fellow prisoner David Telstar to pay $15,000 bail to get him released while awaiting trial for rape and assault. Matt then informed on Telstar, who pleaded guilty to promising Matt an additional $100,000 in a murder-for-hire scheme. Matt did not receive a reduced sentence for informing.

Murders
On December 3, 1997, Richard Matt and his accomplice, Lee Bates, kidnapped his 76-year-old former boss, William Rickerson, in his North Tonawanda home. After attacking him, Matt forced Rickerson into the trunk of Bates' car. Matt believed Rickerson had access to a large sum of money and demanded to know its location. They drove for approximately 27 hours with Rickerson in the trunk to Ohio and back, periodically stopping to beat him.
Later, Matt broke Rickerson's neck with his bare hands. He then dismembered the body with a hacksaw, threw the parts into the Niagara River and fled New York State to avoid capture. The robbery only gained Matt a wedding ring, some credit cards, and less than $100.

After fleeing, Matt crossed the U.S.-Mexican border and entered the city of Matamoros. On February 20, 1998, Matt murdered Charles Arnold Perreault, an American engineer employed at Ranco de Mexico, a local factory. According to news reports, Matt and Perreault were in a bar, and when Perreault went to the restroom, Matt stabbed him nine times in the back and abdomen in an attempt to rob him of $300 USD. 

After assaulting Perreault, Matt attempted to flee the scene of the crime, but was apprehended by police shortly after. Matt provided the name of his half-brother, Wayne M. Schimpf, when questioned by the officers. Matt was convicted of murder in a Mexican court and received a 23-year sentence.

While in prison in Mexico, Matt nearly escaped by climbing to the roof before being shot by guards. According to his son, "He's been shot like nine times. It's like they can't kill him." Matt was turned over to U.S. authorities in 2007. According to court reporter Rick Pfeiffer, the Mexican government placed him without explanation on a plane with a drug kingpin they had agreed to extradite because he had "been such a difficult prisoner."

In 2007, he was extradited back to the United States to face trial for Rickerson's murder, where Bates, who had pled guilty to second-degree murder and received a 15 year to life sentence for his role in the murder, testified against him;  Matt received the maximum 25 years to life in prison for second-degree murder, with no chance of parole until 2032. During his trial for the murder of Rickerson, authorities suspected he had a plan to escape from Niagara County Jail. Matt was made to wear a stun belt and snipers were posted outside the courtroom to prevent his escape.

Clinton Correctional escape

On June 6, 2015, while serving a 25 years to life sentence for Rickerson's murder, the 48-year-old Matt and 34-year-old David Sweat executed an elaborate escape from the maximum security Clinton Correctional Facility in upstate New York and became the subjects of a trans-national manhunt. The escape, which has been compared to Stephen King's The Shawshank Redemption and brought New York Governor Andrew Cuomo to survey their escape route, involved the use of tools to tunnel out of the facility to an "external breach" approximately  outside of the prison wall. The two men had first earned privileged housing in Honor Block, a unit with larger cells available only to prisoners with years without a disciplinary infraction. Prior to the escape, he traded artwork of famous people with a prison guard.

The escape was dramatized in the 2018 Showtime mini-series Escape at Dannemora.

Death
On June 26, 2015, after twenty days on the run and a day after his 49th birthday, Matt fired at a camping trailer driving on the road in an unsuccessful attempt to kill the driver and steal the vehicle. The driver alerted the police, and many U.S. Border Patrol officers were sent to investigate the heavily wooded area; after hearing coughing, they encountered Matt carrying a 20-gauge shotgun. When he refused to drop the weapon, he was shot and killed by Supervisory Agent and former Army Ranger Chris Voss in Franklin County, New York, near the town of Malone, receiving three gunshot wounds to the head. Sweat was caught 2 days later. Sweat began to run and an officer shot him twice, one in his right shoulder and the other in his left arm.

See also
List of prison escapes

References

1966 births
2015 deaths
20th-century American criminals
21st-century American criminals
American escapees
Criminals from New York (state)
Deaths by firearm in New York (state)
Escapees from New York (state) detention
Fugitives
People convicted of murder by Mexico
People convicted of murder by New York (state)
People from Tonawanda, New York
People shot dead by law enforcement officers in the United States
American male painters
Painters from New York (state)